Uranyl acetate is the acetate salt of uranium oxide, a toxic yellow-green powder useful in certain laboratory tests.  Structurally, it is a coordination polymer with formula UO2(CH3CO2)2(H2O)·H2O.

Structure
In the polymer, uranyl (UO22+) centers are bridged by acetate ligands.  The remainder of each (heptacoordinate) coordination sphere is provided by an aquo ligand and a bidentate acetate ligand. One water of crystallization occupies the lattice.

Uses
Uranyl acetate is extensively used as a negative stain in electron microscopy. Most procedures in electron microscopy for biology require the use of uranyl acetate. Negative staining protocols typically treat the sample with 1% to 5% aqueous solution. Uranyl acetate staining is simple and quick to perform and one can examine the sample within a few minutes after staining. Some biological samples are not amenable to uranyl acetate staining and, in these cases, alternative staining techniques and or low-voltage electron microscopy technique may be more suitable.

1% and 2% uranyl acetate solutions are used as an indicator, and a titrant in stronger concentrations in analytical chemistry, as it forms an insoluble salt with sodium (the vast majority of sodium salts are water-soluble). Uranyl acetate solutions show evidence of being sensitive to light, especially UV, and will precipitate if exposed.

Uranyl acetate is also used in a standard test—American Association of State Highway and Transportation Officials (AASHTO) Designation T 299—for alkali-silica reactivity in aggregates (crushed stone or gravel) being considered for use in cement concrete.

Uranyl acetate dihydrate has been used as a starting reagent in experimental inorganic chemistry.

Related compounds
Uranyl carboxylates are known for diverse carboxylic acids (formate, butyrate, acrylate).

Safety
Uranyl acetate is both radioactive and toxic. This mild level of radioactivity is insufficient to be harmful while the material remains external to the body. However, this reason has still lead others to find alternatives, such as neodymium acetate, platinum blue and oolong tea extracts.

Uranyl acetate is very toxic if ingested, inhaled as dust or by skin contact if skin is cut or abraded. The toxicity is due to the combined effect of chemical toxicity and mild radioactivity and there is a danger of cumulative effects from long term exposure.

Uranium salts are predominantly nephrotoxic.

References

Electron microscopy stains
Uranyl compounds
Nuclear materials
Acetates